The 2009 Bryant Bulldogs football team represented Bryant University as a member of the Northeast Conference (NEC) in the 2009 NCAA Division I FCS football season. The Bulldogs were led by sixth-year head coach Marty Fine and played their home games at Bulldog Stadium. They finished the season 5–6 overall and 4–4 in NEC play to tie for fifth place.

Schedule

References

Bryant
Bryant Bulldogs football seasons
Bryant Bulldogs football